James Michael Neil Clarke (born 2 April 2000) is a professional footballer who plays as a defender for National League side Solihull Moors. Born in England, he is a youth international for the Republic of Ireland.

Career

Burnley
Clarke came through the Academy at Burnley and earned a call up to the Republic of Ireland under-18 team in March 2018 where he earned two caps, both against Romania. He turned professional at Turf Moor in April 2018 and was named as Clarets’ Scholar of the Year the following month. However he struggled with injuries in the 2018–19 season and he was allowed to leave the club after losing his place in the under-23 team.

Mansfield Town
On 24 June 2019, Clarke signed a two-year deal with EFL League Two side Mansfield Town, alongside fellow Burnley youth-team graduate Aidan Stone. He made his debut in the English Football League on 20 August, coming on as an 89th-minute substitute for Hayden White in a 3–2 defeat to Leyton Orient at Field Mill. Manager John Dempster went on to hand Clarke his first start for the "Stags" four days later, in a 0–0 draw at home to Stevenage.

Solihull Moors (loan)
In November 2021, he joined National League side Solihull Moors on a short-term loan. At the end of December 2021, after a successful loan spell (6 appearances and 5 clean sheets), the loan was extended to the end of the 2021-22 season.

Solihull Moors
On 14 March 2022, Clarke’s loan deal at Solihull Moors was made permanent, signing a deal until the end of the 2023/24 season.

Career statistics

References

2000 births
Living people
Sportspeople from Birkenhead
Republic of Ireland association footballers
Republic of Ireland youth international footballers
English footballers
English people of Irish descent
Association football defenders
Burnley F.C. players
Mansfield Town F.C. players
Solihull Moors F.C. players
English Football League players
National League (English football) players